In algebraic number theory, the Grunwald–Wang theorem is a local-global principle stating that—except in some precisely defined cases—an element x in a number field K is an nth power in K if it is an nth power in the completion  for all but finitely many primes  of K. For example, a rational number is a square of a rational number if it is a square of a p-adic number for almost all primes p. The Grunwald–Wang theorem is an example of a local-global principle.

The theorem considered by Grunwald and Wang was more general than the one stated above as they discussed the existence of cyclic extensions with certain local properties, and the statement about nth powers is a consequence of this.

History 

, a student of Helmut Hasse, gave an incorrect proof of the erroneous statement that an element in a number field is an nth power if it is an nth power locally almost everywhere.  gave another incorrect proof of this incorrect statement. However  discovered the following counter-example: 16 is a p-adic 8th power for all odd primes p, but is not a rational or 2-adic 8th power. In his doctoral thesis  written under Emil Artin, Wang gave and proved the correct formulation of Grunwald's assertion, by describing the rare cases when it fails. This result is what is now known as the Grunwald–Wang theorem. The history of Wang's counterexample is discussed by

Wang's counter-example 

Grunwald's original claim that an element that is an nth power almost everywhere locally is an nth power globally can fail in two distinct ways: the element can be an nth power almost everywhere locally but not everywhere locally, or it can be an nth power everywhere locally but not globally.

An element that is an nth power almost everywhere locally but not everywhere locally

The element 16 in the rationals is an 8th power at all places except 2, but is not an 8th power in the 2-adic numbers.

It is clear that 16 is not a 2-adic 8th power, and hence not a rational 8th power, since the 2-adic valuation of 16 is 4 which is not divisible by 8.

Generally, 16 is an 8th power in a field K if and only if the polynomial  has a root in K. Write

Thus, 16 is an 8th power in K if and only if 2, −2 or −1 is a square in K. Let p be any odd prime. It follows from the multiplicativity of the Legendre symbol that 2, −2 or −1 is a square modulo p.

An element that is an nth power everywhere locally but not globally

This follows from the above and the equality .

A consequence of Wang's counter-example 

Wang's counterexample has the following interesting consequence showing that one cannot always find a cyclic Galois extension of a given degree of a number field in which finitely many given prime places split in a specified way:

There exists no cyclic degree 8 extension  in which the prime 2 is totally inert (i.e., such that  is unramified of degree 8).

Special fields 

For any  let

Note that the th cyclotomic field is

A field is called s-special if it contains , but neither ,  nor .

Statement of the theorem 

Consider a number field K and a natural number n. Let S be a finite (possibly empty) set of primes of K and put

The Grunwald–Wang theorem says that

unless we are in the special case which occurs when the following two conditions both hold:

  is s-special with an  such that  divides n.
  contains the special set  consisting of those (necessarily 2-adic) primes  such that  is s-special.

In the special case the failure of the Hasse principle is finite of order 2: the kernel of

 

is Z/2Z, generated by the element η.

Explanation of Wang's counter-example 

The field of rational numbers  is 2-special since it contains , but neither ,  nor . Thus, the special case in the Grunwald–Wang theorem occurs when n is divisible by 8, and S contains 2. This explains Wang's counter-example and shows that it is minimal.

This explains the other counter-example above.

See also

The Hasse norm theorem states that for cyclic extensions an element is a norm if it is a norm everywhere locally.

Notes

References

Class field theory
Theorems in algebraic number theory